Adrian Shaw may refer to:
 Adrian Shaw (cricketer) (born 1972), English cricketer
 Adrian Shaw (footballer) (born 1966), English professional football player and coach
 Ade Shaw (born 1947), English musician